Paddock Hills is a neighborhood in Cincinnati, Ohio. The population was 1,038 at the 2020 census.

The neighborhood is noted for its stock of Dutch Colonial Revival architecture, Tudor Revival architecture and bungalow houses.

References

External links 
Paddock Hills Community Council

Neighborhoods in Cincinnati